The ETAP 38i is a Belgian sailboat that was designed by Mortain & Mavrikios as a cruiser and first built in 1989.

Production
The design was built by ETAP Yachting in Belgium between 1989 and 1997, with 95 boats completed, but it is now out of production.

Design
The ETAP 38i is a recreational keelboat, built predominantly of glassfibre. It has a masthead sloop rig, a raked stem, a reverse transom with steps, an internally mounted spade-type rudder controlled by a wheel and a fixed wing keel. It displaces  and carries  of ballast.

The design has sleeping accommodation for six people, with a double "V"-berth in the bow cabin, an "L"-shaped settee and a straight settee in the main cabin and an aft cabin with a double berth on the port side, around a drop-leaf table. The galley is located on the port side just forward of the companionway ladder. The galley is equipped with a three-burner stove and a sink. A navigation station is opposite the galley, on the starboard side. The head is located opposite the galley on the starboard side.

For sailing downwind the design may be equipped with a spinnaker.

Operational history
The boat was at one time supported by a class club, the ETAP Owners Association.

A 2009 Yachting Monthly review wrote, "the company's flush deck designs work better on larger hulls and this was the largest of its type. She is a striking, sea-kindly Harlé Mortain creation with a robust masthead rig and fully battened mainsail. She performs and handles well on all points of sail, though the low boom can be a hazard. The accommodation is dramatically styled with contrasting light-and-dark stained veneers. Critics would say it is too obviously prefabricated, but supporters call it modern and liken the styling to Ikea. Under the bright wheelhouse, the galley is on one side, the chart table on the other and in the middle is an island unit which contains the sinks and stowage. You drop down a step to the saloon, where you run out of headroom going forward. She has a large heads aft and six berths in three cabins, including a spacious double berth in the aft cabin, a smaller double in the forepeak and two sea-berths in the saloon."

See also
List of sailing boat types

References

External links
Photo of an ETAP 38i
Photo of an ETAP 38i

Keelboats
1980s sailboat type designs
Sailing yachts
Sailboat type designs by Mortain & Mavrikios
Sailboat types built by ETAP Yachting